The Hopman Cup XXV (also known as the Hyundai Hopman Cup for sponsorship reasons) corresponds to the 25th edition of the Hopman Cup tournament between nations in men's and women's tennis. The tournament commenced on 29 December 2012 at the Perth Arena in Perth, Western Australia.

Eight teams competed for the title, with two round robin groups of four, from which the top team of each group progress to the final.

Czech Republic were the 2012 champions. In that tournament's final the Czech Republic team of Petra Kvitová and Tomáš Berdych defeated France's Marion Bartoli and Richard Gasquet 2–0. This was the Czech Republic's second Hopman Cup title. They decided not to defend their title; Berdych instead competed at the 2013 Aircel Chennai Open and Kvitová decided to participate at the 2013 Brisbane International.

The 2013 Hopman Cup was won by Spain – Spain's fourth title, defeating Serbia in the final 2–1.
Serbia won the men's singles, followed by Spain's winning of the women's singles; then the deciding mixed doubles event was won by Spain in straight sets.

Tournament
The 2013 Hyundai Hopman Cup is an invitational tennis tournament and is also known as the Official Mixed Teams Championships of the ITF. The 2013 cup has prize money of $1 million and will follow the traditional round robin format, the leading teams after three round robin matches qualify for the final. All matches are best of three sets with the exception of the doubles match where a match tie break, first to ten points, is played if the match is tied at one set all. All ties are played in this format; women's singles, men's singles and finally mixed doubles. In the event of a tie in the final group standings the following will be used to separate the nations; 
 The highest total of matches won
 Best percentage of sets won and lost
 Best percentage of games won and lost
 Head-to-head performances
 Toss of a coin

Entrants

Seeds
The seeds for the 2013 Hopman Cup were decided by tournament director Steve Ayles, Paul Kilderry, Kim Hames and Terry Waldron.

Replacement players
 pre-tournament 

 in-tournament temporary replacements

Group stage

Group A
All times are local (UTC+8).

Standings

Germany vs. Australia

Scores stand as 6–0, 6–0 win for Barty and 6–0, 6–0 win for Barty/Tomic.

Serbia vs. Italy

Italy vs. Germany

Serbia vs. Australia

Italy vs. Australia

Serbia vs. Germany

Score stands as 6–0, 6–0 win for Ivanovic/Djokovic due to Haas' withdrawal before the mixed match.

Group B
All times are local (UTC+8).

Standings

Spain vs. South Africa

USA vs. South Africa

Spain vs. France

USA vs. France

USA vs. Spain

Scores stand as 3–0 win for Spain; 6–0, 6–0 win for Verdasco; 6–0, 6–0 win for Medina Garrigues and 6–0, 6–0 win for Verdasco/Medina Garrigues due to John Isner withdrawal before start of USA vs. Spain match.

South Africa vs. France

Score stands as 6–0, 6–0 win for Scheepers/Anderson.

Final

Serbia vs. Spain

References

External links
 Official Site

Hopman Cup
Hopman Cups by year
Hopman Cup
Hopman Cup
Hopman Cup